Icham Mouissi (born 21 September 1982) is a retired footballer who played as a defender. Born in France, he represented Algeria at under-23 international level.

Club career
Mouissi made his La Liga debut on 21 June 2003.

In 2010, he signed for MC Alger.

On 16 December 2010, Mouissi left MC Alger and signed a contract with R.F.C. Tournai until 2013. He made just two appearances for MC Alger before leaving the club.

International career
Although born in France, Mouissi played for Algeria at the Under-23 level. In 2009, it was reported that Rabah Saadane was considering calling-up him to the Algerian National Team, although that never materialized.

References

External links

1982 births
Living people
Sportspeople from Roubaix
Association football defenders
French footballers
Algerian footballers
French sportspeople of Algerian descent
French expatriate footballers
French expatriate sportspeople in Spain
FC Gueugnon players
Racing de Santander players
MC Alger players
Ligue 2 players
La Liga players
Challenger Pro League players
Expatriate footballers in Spain
Expatriate footballers in Belgium
Algerian expatriate sportspeople in Spain
Algerian expatriate sportspeople in Belgium
Algerian Ligue Professionnelle 1 players
Algeria under-23 international footballers
Wasquehal Football players
French expatriate sportspeople in Belgium